Ellis Reynolds Shipp MD FAAP  (January 20, 1847 – January 31, 1939) was one of the first female doctors in Utah and west of the Mississippi.  She founded the School of Nursing and Obstetrics in 1879, and was on the board of the Deseret Hospital Association. Shipp successfully combined motherhood and a medical practice, saying, "It is to me the crowning joy of a woman’s life to be a mother." In her 50-year medical career, she delivered more than 5000 babies and led the School of Nursing and Obstetrics to train more than 500 women as licensed midwives.

Biography 
Born Ellis Reynolds, she emigrated with her family to Utah Territory in 1852. Her family was among the early Mormon pioneer settlers of Pleasant Grove, Utah. In 1866, Ellis Reynolds married Milford Shipp. She bore a total of ten children, six of whom survived infancy.

Shipp began studying at the University of Deseret, and later in Philadelphia at the Women's Medical College of Pennsylvania in 1875. She left her children behind in Utah Territory in the care of her husband's three other wives. Brigham Young sponsored her education in the eastern United States and she later did further medical studies at the University of Michigan. When she returned to Utah, Ellis Shipp worked with Eliza R. Snow to start an obstetrics school, eventually training 660 midwives.

In 1910, she published a book of her own poems, Life Lines.

Shipp served as a member of the General Board of the Relief Society from 1898 to 1907. She also served on the general board of the Young Women's Mutual Improvement Association.

Shipp died at age 92 in Salt Lake City on January 31, 1939, of cancer.

Honors 
A neighborhood park in Salt Lake City, Utah, is named in Shipp's honor; it is located near where she lived and practiced medicine. A public health center in West Valley, Utah, is also named in her honor.

Ellis Reynolds Shipp Hall (Building 11) of the women's dormitories in the old Heritage Halls at Brigham Young University was named after Shipp.

Shipp is honored with a display room in the Daughters of Utah Pioneers Pioneer Memorial Museum in Salt Lake City.

Notes

References 
.
.
.
.
.

1847 births
1939 deaths
American Latter Day Saint hymnwriters
American women physicians
Drexel University alumni
Mormon pioneers
People from Pleasant Grove, Utah
Relief Society people
University of Michigan Medical School alumni
University of Utah alumni
Young Women (organization) people
American leaders of the Church of Jesus Christ of Latter-day Saints
Physicians from Utah
American women poets
Deaths from cancer in Utah
American women hymnwriters
Latter Day Saints from Utah
American women non-fiction writers